Skull Hollow is a small campground in the Ochoco National Forest & Crooked River National Grassland. It is located in Central Oregon east of Terrebonne, Oregon and often used as a campground for people who are visiting Smith Rock State Park.

History 

Skull Hollow is named after the number of human skulls found in the area. The skulls were found as part of a massacre between settlers and Native Americans in the area under the leadership of Chief Paulina in the winter of 1864. Soldiers found the remains of some 200 people, 40 burned-out wagons and the personal effects of those murdered.

Geography 
Skull Hollow is a High Desert area. It is 3,120 feet above sea level.

Camping  
It is a campground with limited amenities and has 64 spots for cars and tents with a $10/night charge single sites $20/night double sites, $5/night extra vehicles per night $5/day day use for use of restrooms and trash. Amenities include tent camping, camping trailer, picnic tables, fire pits, toilets, parking, and cycling accessibility no potable water onsite but the hosts sell water and wood. Or you can get potable water at nearby Smith Rock or Haystack campground.

Hiking 
There is the Skull Hollow Trailhead located at the campground. The trailhead is northwest of the campground on Forest Service Road 5710. The trail gives access to the Cole Loop Trail. This trail junctions with the Warner Loop Trail and, further on, the Gray Butte Trail. During the spring and later fall, the Gray Butte Trail can become muddy to the point of impassable for hikers and mountain bikers.

References 

Campgrounds in the United States
Hiking trails in Oregon
Grasslands of Oregon
United States Forest Service
Battlefields of the wars between the United States and Native Americans
Snake War
Ochoco National Forest